The Crewe Works Railway was a narrow gauge internal tramway system serving Crewe Works, the main locomotive construction works of the London and North Western Railway (LNWR) and later the London Midland and Scottish Railway (LMS). The system was first introduced by John Ramsbottom the LNWR Locomotive Superintendent from 1857 and it was a pioneering use of locomotive propelled vehicles within a manufacturing plant. The Crewe system was soon adopted elsewhere. There were four sections to this system built at different times and each in turn significantly altered several times before final abandonment. The four sections were:
 The Original LNWR (Old) Works (authorised 17 October 1861)
 The LNWR Steel Works (authorised 20 October 1864)
 The LNWR Deviation Works (built in the late 1860s)
 The Spider Bridge extension to Crewe railway station (built in 1878).

Of the above, the first section dating from 1862 was within the original locomotive works first built in 1843 and expanded many times as the railway system grew. Prior to the introduction of the tramway most internal transport was by hand-cart and barrow. The original lines totalled  and to this was soon added a further . The "Old Works" section ceased operation c1929.

The second, the steel works section, and largest of all, was always self-contained and from its authorisation on 20 October 1864 lasted under locomotive haulage until the closure of steel production in 1932, but also in one short and occasionally used hand propelled section in the iron foundry until c1960.

The third, the deviation works section (latterly devoted entirely to the joinery department), was an extensive system built on at least three levels and was an entirely separate, hand propelled, tramway, which survived in spasmodic use until about 1980. Several relics including examples of trackwork and three wagons survive from this installation.

The fourth and final extension of the works tramway was of the "Old Works" system through to Crewe station made in 1878 with the construction of the famous "Spider Bridge". This was essentially a typical railway footbridge providing pedestrian access from the works to the station and built on stilts and suspension cables for several hundred yards across the entire Crewe North junction. The bridge carried the 18" single-line tramway down its centre. The spider bridge terminated at the station in a "T" junction with a footbridge spanning all passenger platforms at the north end of the station. The bridge from the works survived, as a footbridge, until 1939 but was apparently little used by locomotives after 1920. Goods for transfer between the works and the station had to be manhandled between the tramway and the station platform via the footbridge steps. This was a surprising and serious limitation of its usefulness.

Following the abandonment of the locomotive hauled tramway, most internal works transport at Crewe has been provided by petrol/diesel-engined, rubber tyred, tractors and trailers.

Locomotives

References

See also
 British industrial narrow gauge railways

18 in gauge railways in England
Industrial railways in England